Dynamite Canyon is a 1941 American Western film directed by Robert Emmett Tansey and written by Robert Emmett Tansey and Frances Kavanaugh. The film stars Tom Keene, Sugar Dawn, Slim Andrews, Evelyn Finley, Stanley Price and Kenne Duncan. The film was released on August 8, 1941, by Monogram Pictures.

Plot

Cast          
Tom Keene as Tom Evans / Ed 'Trigger' Jones
Sugar Dawn as Sugar Gray
Slim Andrews as Slim
Evelyn Finley as Midge Reed
Stanley Price as Duke Rand
Kenne Duncan as Rod 
Gene Alsace as Regan
Tom London as Captain Gray
Fred Hoose as Colonel Blake
Rusty the Horse as Rusty

References

External links
 

1941 films
1940s English-language films
American Western (genre) films
1941 Western (genre) films
Monogram Pictures films
Films directed by Robert Emmett Tansey
American black-and-white films
1940s American films